Dean Neugent (May 28, 1916 – April 1, 2003) was an American politician who served in the Texas House of Representatives from district 21-2 from 1965 to 1973.

He died on April 1, 2003, in Webster, Texas at age 86.

References

1916 births
2003 deaths
Democratic Party members of the Texas House of Representatives
20th-century American politicians